Denny Scott Miller (born Dennis Linn Miller; April 25, 1934 – September 9, 2014) was an American actor, perhaps best known for his regular role as Duke Shannon on Wagon Train, his guest-starring appearances on Gilligan's Island and Charlie's Angels, and his 1959 film role as Tarzan.

Background
A native of Bloomington, Indiana, the 6'4' Miller was a basketball player for the UCLA Bruins at UCLA, where his father was a physical education instructor. 

In his senior year, while he was working as a furniture mover to pay for school, Miller was discovered on Sunset Boulevard by a Hollywood agent who signed him with Metro-Goldwyn-Mayer. His screen test was directed by George Cukor.

Acting career
Miller became the first blond Tarzan in Tarzan, the Ape Man (1959), a cheapie/quickie which lifted most of its footage from earlier Johnny Weissmuller movies. Miller had been recommended by someone else considered for the role, William Smith, later a star of the NBC Laredo western series. MGM had Miller under contract for twenty months; in that time, he worked only eight weeks as Tarzan.

Miller did guest spots on a number of television series, such as Northwest Passage and Overland Trail. In 1960, the 26-year-old Miller appeared as Wilkie, the son of a powerful rancher, in the "License to Kill" episode of Laramie. He also appeared on Have Gun, Will Travel and an episode of The Rifleman as a dimwitted gunfighter named Reuben Miles.

From 1961 to 1964, Miller was a regular on Wagon Train in the role of the scout, Duke Shannon. After the cancellation of Wagon Train in 1965, Miller starred as Mike McCluskey on the NBC sitcom Mona McCluskey.

He guest starred on such series as Gunsmoke, The Fugitive, The High Chaparral, Gilligan's Island, I Dream of Jeannie, The Brady Bunch, Alice, Death Valley Days, Hawaii Five-O, Emergency!, 
The Six Million Dollar Man, Quincy M.E., The New Adventures of Wonder Woman, Battlestar Galactica, Quark, Charlie's Angels, Buck Rogers in the 25th Century, The Incredible Hulk, M*A*S*H, and V. 
 
Miller appeared in over 200 television series and, for 14
years, he played the Gorton's Fisherman in TV commercials.

His film career included roles in Love in a Goldfish Bowl (1961), and the part of "Wyoming" Bill Kelso in The Party (1968), which he remembered as the part he most enjoyed. His other film credits included Making It (1971), Doomsday Machine (1972), Buck and the Preacher (1972), The Gravy Train (1974), The Island at the Top of the World (1974), The Norseman (1978), Caboblanco (1980) and Circle of Power (1981).

Books
Miller wrote an autobiography titled Didn't You Used to Be...What's His Name? in January 28, 2004 and a book about obesity in the United States called Toxic Waist? ... Get to Know Sweat!.

Family
Miller lived with his second wife Nancy in Las Vegas, Nevada and taught classes in relaxation.

Death
Miller was diagnosed with Amyotrophic lateral sclerosis (ALS) in January 2014. He died in Las Vegas on September 9, 2014 at the age of 80.

Filmography

See also
Mike Henry
Buster Crabbe
Lex Barker
Ron Ely

Notes

External links
 
 Entry for Denny Miller at Brian's Drive-In Theater
 Official Denny Miller Website
 Erbzine

1934 births
2014 deaths
People from Bloomington, Indiana
Male actors from Indiana
American male film actors
American male television actors
Male actors from Los Angeles
People from the Las Vegas Valley
University of California, Los Angeles alumni
UCLA Bruins men's basketball players
Writers from Indiana
Neurological disease deaths in Nevada
Deaths from motor neuron disease
American autobiographers
American non-fiction writers
Western (genre) television actors
American men's basketball players
20th-century American male actors